Pleven Zoo is a zoo located in Kaylaka Park in Pleven, a city in Bulgaria.

The zoo is known for its brown bears, and some of the Zoos bears were adopted from the forest.

Notes

Buildings and structures in Pleven
Zoos in Bulgaria